5 Camelopardalis is a binary star system in the northern circumpolar constellation of Camelopardalis, located about 770 light years away from the Sun as determined using parallax. With an apparent magnitude of 5.5, it can be seen with the naked eye as a faint, blue-white hued star. The system is moving further from the Earth with a heliocentric radial velocity of +2.4 km/s.

The primary component is a B-type main sequence star with a stellar classification of B9.5 V. However, Abt and Morrell (1995) found a luminosity class of IV, suggesting it is instead a subgiant star that is evolving off the main sequence. It has a high rate of spin with a projected rotational velocity of 102 km/s and has 2.15 times the mass of the Sun. The star is radiating 226 times the luminosity of the Sun from its photosphere at an effective temperature of 9,931 K.

The magnitude 12.9 common proper motion companion lies at an angular separation of 12.9″.  It appears to be slightly smaller and cooler than the Sun.

References

External links
 HR 1555
 5 Camelopardalis
 CCDM J04551+5516

B-type main-sequence stars
B-type subgiants
Binary stars
Camelopardalis (constellation)
Durchmusterung objects
Camelopardalis,05
030958
022854
1555